Sean Brosnan may refer to:

 Seán Brosnan (1916–1979), Irish Fianna Fáil politician
 Sean Brosnan (actor) (born 1983), American actor, son of actor Pierce Brosnan